Mavis Owureku-Asare is a Ghanaian food scientist. She researched the use of solar dehydration to preserve tomatoes. She conducted research showing that poor quality foods were sold in some Ghanaian markets.
She is a senior research scientist at the Biotechnology and Nuclear Agriculture Research Institute of the Ghana Atomic Energy Commission. She is a fellow of the Norman E. Borlaug Leadership Enhancement in Agriculture Program (LEAP) and a recipient of the African Women in Agricultural Research and Development (AWARD).

Education 
Owureku-Asare holds a PhD in Food Science from the Kwame Nkrumah University of Science and Technology. She is a visiting scholar at Purdue University, West Lafayette 
Indiana USA. She attended Wesley Girls' Senior High School in Cape Coast. She holds a certification in the FSPCA Preventive Controls Course for Human Food from the USDA.

Career 
She is the founder of Kasmalink Consult, a nonprofit organization that provides local food processors with technical support and resources to help them produce competitive food brands on the global market. She is on the Board of Impact Food hub, a food processing and agribusiness consultancy based in Ghana. She is also a board member of Ghana-India Trade Advisory Chamber (GITAC).

Research 
She studies practical agricultural technologies and solutions that help smallhold farmers and improve the livelihoods of women in Ghana. One of her efforts focused on developing improved solar drying technologies for the post-harvest management of locally grown agricultural produce with a focus on tomatoes.

She researched the quality of foods sold in Ghanaian markets and discovered that foods sold in five markets (Agbogbloshie, Dome, Kaneshie, Makola and Okaishie) in Ghana contained poor nutrients. The foods examined in this research included tomatoes, oranges, pineapples, garden eggs, cocoyam leaves, shrimp and fish powder. It was revealed that fruits such as oranges were displayed in the sun and on the floor, which affects the vitamin C content of the fruit. Likewise, she found that due to the market conditions, substances like lycopene and other antioxidants in tomatoes were destroyed. Her research also revealed that 98% of palm oil on sale was adulterated with cancer-causing agents and groundnut paste was mixed with dried cassava powder.

Awards and recognition 
 African Women in Agricultural Research and Development Fellow
2012 recipient, Norman E. Borlaug International Agricultural Science and Technology scholarship award.
 2015 Norman E. Borlaug Leadership Enhancement in Agriculture Program (LEAP)
OWSD Early Career fellow
2020 Aspen New Voices fellow

References

Living people
Ghanaian women scientists
Ghanaian food scientists
Kwame Nkrumah University of Science and Technology alumni
Year of birth missing (living people)
Ghanaian scientists